La negociadora is a Mexican thriller drama web television series produced by 11:11 Films for the streaming services Claro Video. Manolo Cardona serves as showrunner of the series, along with David Ruiz as director. The series is based on an original idea of Punta Fina Content and the first season consists of 12 episodes. It stars Bárbara Mori as the titular character.

Cast

Main 
 Bárbara Mori as Eugenia Velazco
 Diego Cadavid as Marco Torrez
 Carlos Aragón Juan Velasco
 Horacio García Rojas as Jorge Nieves
 Marcela Guirado Abril Islas
 Marco Treviño as Guillermo Sánchez
 Karina Gidi as María Hurtado
 Adrián Ladrón as Farolito
 Ximena Ayala as Flor

Recurring 
 Aldo Gallardo as Carlos Dos Santos
 Jesús Benavente as Alfredo Hernández
 Irineo Álvarez as Octavio
 Ana Layevska as Mónica Sánchez
 Fiona Palomo as Waleska Acosta
 Constanza Hernández as Rosa Acosta
 Julio Echeverry as Melquíades Sagasti
 Tommy Vásquez as Magín
 Juan Carlos Remolina as Agustín Negrete
 Jorge Gallegos as Mauro Guzmán
 Giovanna Zacarías as Jeanette Cafrune
 Mariana Gajá as Milagros
 Ivana de Maria as Juliana Ríos
 Azul Guaita as Susana Vega
 Pedro González as Pepe Garrido
 Iván López as Tato
 Luis Velázquez as Dr. Xavier Cova
 Christian Tappan as Cicerón

References

External links 
 

Mexican television series
Spanish-language television shows
Claro Video original programming
2021 Mexican television series debuts
2021 Mexican television series endings